The hôtel du Châtelet is a hôtel particulier, a kind of large townhouse of France, at 127, rue de Grenelle, in the 7th arrondissement, Paris. The building is now the home of the Ministry of Labour and the minister’s official residence.

History
Hôtel du Châtelet was commissioned from Mathurin Cherpitel in 1770 by the Duke of Châtelet, and completed in 1776. After the duke was guillotined in 1793, the house was inscribed on the list of civil buildings, and it served from 1796 to 1807 as the headquarters of the École nationale des ponts et chaussées.

From 1807 to 1830, it was attached to the Imperial, and later Royal, Household. Between 1830 and 1849, it served as the Turkish embassy, and then the Austrian embassy. In 1849, Napoleon III's government paid for renovations and gave the building to the Archbishop of Paris whose palace had burned down in 1831. From 1849 to 1905, the building's main body served as the archiepiscopal residence.

Upon the 1905 French law on the Separation of the Churches and the State, the state took the building back, granting it in 1907 to what was then called the Ministry of Labour and Social Welfare. Following restoration in 1908, it became the headquarters of the ministry. In 1968, it was the site of the signature of the Grenelle agreements.

Buildings and structures in the 7th arrondissement of Paris
Châtelet
Houses completed in 1776